Epirrhoe is a genus of moths in the family Geometridae erected by Jacob Hübner in 1825.

Species
 Epirrhoe alternata (Müller, 1764)
 Epirrhoe dubiosata (Alphéraky, 1883)
 Epirrhoe fulminata (Alphéraky, 1883)
 Epirrhoe galiata (Denis & Schiffermüller, 1775)
 Epirrhoe hastulata (Hübner, 1790)
 Epirrhoe latevittata (Turati, 1913)
 Epirrhoe medeifascia (Grossbeck, 1908)
 Epirrhoe molluginata (Hübner, 1813)
 Epirrhoe plebeculata (Guenée, 1857)
 Epirrhoe pupillata (Thunberg, 1788)
 Epirrhoe rivata (Hübner, [1813])
 Epirrhoe sandosaria (Herrich-Schäffer, 1852)
 Epirrhoe sperryi Herbulot, 1951
 Epirrhoe supergressa (Butler, 1879)
 Epirrhoe tartuensis Möls, 1965
 Epirrhoe timozzaria (Constant, 1884)
 Epirrhoe tristata (Linnaeus, 1758)

References

 
Xanthorhoini